International Standard Musical Work Code (ISWC) is a unique identifier for musical works, similar to ISBN for books. It is adopted as international standard ISO 15707. The ISO subcommittee with responsibility for the standard is TC 46/SC 9.

Format 
Each code is composed of three parts:
 prefix element (1 character)
 work identifier (9 digits)
 check digit (1 digit)

Currently, the only prefix defined is "T", indicating Musical works.  However, additional prefixes may be defined in the future to expand the available range of identifiers and/or expand the system to additional types of works.

Computation of the check digit

With
 : one of the nine digits of the work identifier (i=1 to 9) from left to right.
 : check digit.

Example: T-034.524.680-C

ISWC identifiers are commonly written the form T-123.456.789-C. The grouping is for ease of reading only; the numbers do not incorporate any information about the work's region, author, publisher, etc. Rather, they are simply issued in sequence. These separators are not required, and no other separators are allowed.

The first ISWC was assigned in 1995, for the song "Dancing Queen" by ABBA; the code is T-000.000.001-0.

Usage 
To register an ISWC, the following minimal information must be supplied:
 title
 names of all composers, arrangers and authors, with their role in the piece (identified by role code) and their CAE/IPI number
 work classification code (CIS)
 identification of other works it is a derivative of

Note: an ISWC identifies works, not recordings. ISRC can be used to identify recordings. Nor does it identify individual publications (e.g. issues of a recording on physical media, sheet music, broadcast at a particular frequency/modulation/time/location...)

Its primary purpose is in collecting society administration, and to clearly identify works in legal contracts. It would also be useful in library cataloguing.

Due to the fact that a musical work can have multiple authors, it is inevitable that, on rare occasions, a duplicate ISWC might exist and might not be detected immediately. Because of the existing business practices among collecting societies, it is not possible to simply declare an ISWC as obsolete. In such cases, as soon as they are identified, the system will deal with duplicate registrations by linking such registration records in the ISWC database and its related  products.

See also
 International Standard Music Number
 Global Release Identifier
 International Standard University Code, higher educational institution verification

References 

 New ISO standard for worldwide identification of musical works/key

External links
 The registration authority
 TC 46 SC 9 website
 http://www.iswc.org/en/agencies.html
 look up at iswcnet.cisac.org
The International Confederation of Societies of Authors and Composers (CISAC) has overhauled the ISWC global-identification system for the first time since 2005, and more than 100 societies are onboard with the changes.

Music technology
ISO standards
Identifiers
Unique identifiers